Amboherpia is a genus of solenogaster, a kind of shell-less, worm-like mollusk.

Species
 Amboherpia abyssokurilensis Bergmeier, Brandt, Schwabe & Jörger, 2017
 Amboherpia dolicopharyngeata Gil-Mansilla, García-Álvarez & Urgorri, 2008
 Amboherpia heterotecta Handl & Salvini-Plawen, 2002

References

External links
  Handl C. & Salvini-Plawen L. von. (2002). New records of Solenogastres-Cavibelonia (Mollusca) from Norwegian fjords and shelf waters including three new species. Sarsia. 87(6): 423-450
 Gil-Mansilla, E., Garcia-Alvarez, O. & Urgorri, V. 2008. New Acanthomeniidae (Solenogastres, Cavibelonia) from the abyssal Angola Basin. In: Martinez Arbizu, P. & Brix, S. (Eds) Bringing Light into Deep-sea Biodiversity. Zootaxa, 1866: 175- 186

Solenogastres